Dosalan (Persian: دوسَلان ) in the north of Iran. It is one of the most popular countrysides of Gilan Province.

Coordinates
UTM : UA96

Geographical coordinates in decimal degrees (WGS84)
Latitude : 36.733
Longitude : 49.783

Geographical coordinates in degrees minutes seconds (WGS84)
Latitude : 36 44' 00" 
Longitude : 49 47' 00"

Places near Dosalan
A'ineh deh - Abdarreh - Chelvan sara - Do saleh deh - Jirandeh - Kur cheshmeh - Labarbon - Lavarbon - Mian kushk - Miansu - Qusheh laneh - Seh pestanak - Susef-kaftar chaak.

From
 Book of Amarlu - M.M. Zand

Populated places in Gilan Province